Tarek Yehia Fouad Abdelazim (born 18 May 1987), known as Tarek Abdelazim or Tarek Yehia, is an Egyptian weightlifter. He was awarded the bronze medal in 85 kg event at 2012 London Olympic Games retroactively after the Russian silver medalist Apti Aukhadov failed a doping test.

References

External links
 
 

1987 births
Living people
Egyptian male weightlifters
Olympic weightlifters of Egypt
Weightlifters at the 2008 Summer Olympics
Weightlifters at the 2012 Summer Olympics
World Weightlifting Championships medalists
Medalists at the 2012 Summer Olympics
Olympic bronze medalists for Egypt
Olympic medalists in weightlifting
People from Minya Governorate
Mediterranean Games silver medalists for Egypt
Mediterranean Games bronze medalists for Egypt
Mediterranean Games medalists in weightlifting
Competitors at the 2009 Mediterranean Games
21st-century Egyptian people